Lowbrow, or lowbrow art, is an underground visual art movement that arose in the Los Angeles, California area in the late 1960s. It is a populist art movement with its cultural roots in underground comix, punk music, tiki culture, graffiti, and hot-rod cultures of the street. It is also often known by the name pop surrealism. Lowbrow art often has a sense of humor – sometimes the humor is gleeful, impish, or a sarcastic comment.

Most lowbrow artworks are paintings, but there are also toys, digital art, and sculpture.

History
Some of the first artists to create what came to be known as lowbrow art were underground cartoonists like Robert Williams and Gary Panter. Barry McGee, Margaret Killgalen, Dan "Plasma" Rauch and Camilla Elke were amongst the first to pioneer Lowbrow as a street art, zine, fashion, graffiti, and counter culture movement. The purpose of the lowbrow movement was to take an unorthodox approach to art and to completely defy its "rules". This resulted in pushback from significant individuals and organizations in the art industry. Early shows were in alternative galleries in New York and Los Angeles such as Psychedelic Solutions Gallery in Greenwich Village, New York City which was run by Jacaeber Kastor, La Luz de Jesus run by Billy Shire and 01 gallery in Hollywood, run by John Pochna. The movement steadily grew from its beginning, with hundreds of artists adopting this style. As the number of artists grew, so did the number of galleries showing lowbrow. In 1992 Greg Escalante helped orchestrate the first formal gallery exhibition to take lowbrow art seriously; painter Anthony Ausgang's solo show "Looney Virtues” at the Julie Rico Gallery in Santa Monica. The Bess Cutler Gallery also went on to show important artists and helped expand the kind of art that was classified as lowbrow. The lowbrow magazine Juxtapoz, launched in 1994 by Robert Williams, Greg Escalante, and Eric Swenson, has been a mainstay of writing on lowbrow art and has helped shape and expand the movement.

Etymology
In an article in the February 2006 issue of his magazine Juxtapoz, Robert Williams took credit for originating the term "lowbrow art".  He stated that in 1979 Gilbert Shelton of the publisher Rip Off Press decided to produce a book featuring Willams' paintings. Williams said he decided to give the book the self-deprecating title The Lowbrow Art of Robt. Williams, since no authorized art institution would recognize his type of art. "Lowbrow" was thus used by Williams in opposition to "highbrow". He said the name then stuck, even though he feels it is inappropriate. Williams refers to the movement as "cartoon-tainted abstract surrealism." Lately, Williams has begun referring to his own work as "Conceptual Realism".

Anthony Ausgang 

 Mark Ryden
 Robert Williams
 Corrie Erickson
 Camille Rose Garcia 
 Shag
 Todd Schorr
 Greg Simkins 
 Amy Sol
 Kenny Scharf
 Ray Caesar
 Esao Andrews
 Marion Peck
 Tara McPherson
 Sunny Buick
 Peca
 Audrey Kawasaki
 Jason Limón 
 Victor Castillo 
 Miss Van 
 Joe Vaux 
 Brandi Milne 
 Lola Gil 
 Martin Wittfooth 
 Hannah Yata 
 Gregory Jacobsen 
 Naoto Hattori 
 Dan Quintana
 Gregory Hergert
 Renee French 
 Travis Lampe
 Mark Rogers
 Gary Baseman 
 Mark Bryan
 Ciou
 Van Arno

Books
There are several books which offer overview histories of lowbrow, including the following:
 
  A collection of La Luz de Jesus Gallery in Hollywood, CA that has carried Lowbrow art for 25 years.

Magazines
Juxtapoz
PORK (magazine)
Beautiful/Decay Magazine
 Tokion is a magazine with both Japanese and US editions.
Hi-Fructose
Beautiful Bizarre Magazine
Hey Magazine

See also
Chicago Imagists
Decadent movement
Dieselpunk
Kitsch
Kustom Kulture
Massurrealism
Middlebrow
Naive art
Outsider art
Stuckism
Superflat
Tiki culture
Underground art

References

Citations

Sources 

 

 

 

 

 

 

 

 Magliozzi, Ron.  "Tim Burton: Exercising the Imagination." Tim Burton.  The Museum of Modern Art, 2009, pp. 9-15.

External links
 Interview with Kirsten Anderson, editor of Pop Surrealism
 2005 L.A. Weekly article on lowbrow

American art movements
American contemporary art
Contemporary art movements
Art in Greater Los Angeles
Underground culture
Popular culture
1970s in California
20th century in Los Angeles
1960s in art
1970s in art
1980s in art
1990s in art